Sentul International Circuit is a 50,000-capacity permanent motor racing circuit located at Sentul City, Babakan Madang, Bogor Regency, West Java, Indonesia, near the toll gate of Jakarta towards Bogor city and areas at the foot of Jonggol Mountains 

Its pit facilities have easy access to the Jagorawi Toll Road. The current circuit is a truncated version of the original design. Approximately 40% shorter than the original, the circuit runs clockwise and is predominantly used for motorcycle racing and the Asian F3 series. Sentul is a relatively simple, smooth, broad track with large runoff areas, enabling non-bumpy and smooth driving at racing speeds. Sentul has a  main straight that allows speeds of up to  before slowing for the right-hand Turn 1. The only truly high-speed corner at Sentul is Turn 2. The fastest driver on four-wheel machines can do , and the fastest rider can do  on two-wheel machines. The wide corners allow good passing with various racing lines.

Located in Bogor Regency, Sentul is a hilly area at the foot of the Jonggol Mountains and a bit cooler than the tropical city of Jakarta. However, the track can still get extremely hot under direct sunlight. It is also humid and wet as well. Such characteristics cause distress to European tuners, riders and drivers who are accustomed to cooler climates.

History 

Sentul International Circuit (section) was designed to meet the Formula One motor racing standard and was the first serious attempt outside Japan to meet such a standard in Asia. The vision came to Indonesia around 1990 when Hutomo Mandala Putra, motor racing enthusiast and son of President Suharto, began promoting the construction of a track at Sentul. Racing had previously been held at the short, tight and relatively dangerous Jaya Ancol Circuit, on the Java Sea coast in North Jakarta. In August 1993, the circuit was officially opened by Suharto.

While Sentul International Circuit was intended to be Indonesia's Formula Two showcase to the world, its tight corners and shortened  length rendered it unsuitable for Formula One. On 13 October 1996 the Pacific GP was to be held at the Sentul Circuit but it was cancelled for previous mentioned reason. Sentul has been used for the Superbike World Championship between 1994 and 1997 and the FIM Road Racing World Championship Grand Prix in 1996 and 1997. 

The 1997 Asian Financial Crisis worsened the situation and made motor racing an unaffordable luxury for many Indonesian enthusiasts who had been participating. The facility has also come to be overshadowed by the Sepang International Circuit, built in 1999, which possessed a superior track layout and facilities.

In the mid-2000s, the circuit held two rounds of the A1 Grand Prix of Nations, in the 2005–06 and 2006–07 seasons respectively. In 2008, the GP2 Asia Series raced at Sentul. A Superstars Series race was planned in 2012 and an Asian Le Mans Series race in 2013, but these ultimately were cancelled.

MotoGP was set to return to Indonesia in 2017, dependent on finding the 15 billion rupiah (approximately 1.12 million USD) required to get the circuit up to FIM Grade 1. Due to the rapid rise in popularity of Formula One in Indonesia following the debut of Rio Haryanto in 2016, Formula One Management are said to be looking into the viability of holding a race at Sentul provided the upgrades are given the green light, however the plan never materialized, and Dorna Sports would eventually gave the hosting rights for the return of the Indonesian motorcycle Grand Prix to the Mandalika Circuit in Lombok instead of Sentul, which was held in March 2022.

Sentul International Circuit continues to host various events but mostly motorbike racing with ISSOM events also held throughout the year. It also hosted the para-cycling road race for the 2018 Asian Para Games.

Track description 
 Track length: 
 Width: 
 Longest straight: 
 FIA Grade 2 track license 
 50 pit garages
 2 covered grandstands
Other facilities include:
 Motocross, Autocross and Go-Karts Circuits 
 Three-star International Hotel
 Bungalows / Guest House
 International Golf Course
 Restaurant
 Recreation Centre

Lap records

The official race lap records at the Sentul International Circuit are listed as:

Events

 Current

 Idemitsu bLU CRu Yamaha Sunday Race
 Indoprix

 Former

 A1 Grand Prix (2005–2006)
 Asia Road Racing Championship
 Formula BMW
 Asian Formula 3 (2005–2006)
 GP2 Asia Series (2008)
 Grand Prix motorcycle racing Indonesian motorcycle Grand Prix (1996–1997)
 Porsche Carrera Cup
 Speedcar Series (2008)
 Superbike World Championship (1994–1997)

Events winners

Indonesian motorcycle Grand Prix

Superbike World Championship

A1 Grand Prix

GP2 Asia

Speedcar Series

Asian Formula 3

Series 2005

Series 2006

Fatalities

 Iqbal Hakeem - 2019 Private Test. 
 Kevin Safaruddin Madria - 2022 Idemitsu bLU CRu Yamaha Sunday Race.

See also

 List of motor racing tracks

References

External links
Official Website
Trackpedia's guide to racing and driving the Sentul Circuit
Track info from AFOS Official Website

Sentul
Superbike World Championship circuits
A1 Grand Prix circuits
Motorsport venues in Indonesia
Sports venues in Indonesia
Indonesian Grand Prix
Buildings and structures in West Java
Tourist attractions in West Java
Sport in West Java
Bogor Regency